Cerro Blanco is an underground metro station on the Line 2 of the Santiago Metro, in Santiago, Chile. The station takes its name from the nearby Cerro Blanco (White Hill). It was opened on 8 September 2004 as the northern terminus of the extension of the line from Puente Cal y Canto. On 25 November 2005 the line was extended further north to Einstein.

References

Santiago Metro stations
Railway stations opened in 2004
Santiago Metro Line 2